Urgent.ly is a roadside assistance and mobility assistance technology company that was founded in May 2013 and is based in Vienna, Virginia. It services the roadside assistance industry in North America, Europe, Asia, and Australia.

Mobile app
The app connects users with roadside assistance providers.  Users pay the service providers directly through the app. The app is available on Android and iOS.  The app was added to the AT&T Drive platform for connected cars in 2015.
Urgent.ly partnered with MapQuest in November 2014.

History 
Urgent.ly was founded in May 2013 and launched its service in April 2014, initially servicing Washington, DC, and the surrounding areas. The company launched its free iOS app in 2014. Later that year, the service was expanded nationwide and is now available across all 50 states, Washington, DC, and Puerto Rico.

Urgent.ly partnered with MapQuest in November 2014, a partnership that allowed MapQuest users to use Urgent.ly to call for roadside assistance.

In March 2015, the app was chosen to be added to the AT&T Drive platform for connected cars.
In February 2017, Washington, DC-based media company DC Inno reported Urgent.ly's partnership with carmaker Mercedes-Benz.

On December 6, 2017, CCC Information Services, Inc. announced Urgent.ly as an addition to the CCC Network.

On January 23, 2018, Urgent.ly announced integration with Towbook, a provider of cloud-based towing software for roadside assistance companies.

On April 3, 2018, Uber announced Urgent.ly as a partner on the Uber-branded Visa Debit Card for Uber drivers. Urgent.ly roadside assistance is available to all Uber drivers for a monthly fee, and cardholders receive a discount.

Services

Roadside-as-a-Service 
Urgent.ly provides a service provider network for companies in the automotive, insurance, telematics, and other transportation-focused vertical industries, including new mobility segments (e.g., ride-sharing, bike-sharing, autonomous vehicles, electric vehicles).

Platform Services 
Urgent.ly also sells access to their platform to other providers within the industry.

Direct to Consumer 
Urgent.ly develops, markets, and operates the Urgent.ly mobile app that connects users with roadside assistance providers.

Funding
In April 2014, CIT Gap Funds and Blu Venture invested $525,000 in seed funding into Urgent.ly.

In October 2014, Select Venture Partners invested $1.2 million in pre-Series A funding with contributions from CIT Gap Funds and Blu Venture.

In September 2015, Allianz Digital Corporate Ventures, Verizon Ventures, and Forte Ventures invested in a $7 million Series A round.

In October 2017, American Tire Distributors, Verizon Ventures, and Forté Ventures invested $10 million in the Series B round.

In January 2019, Urgent.ly announced it had raised $21 million in new Series B funding with participation from BMW i Ventures; InMotion Ventures, Jaguar Land Rover's venture capital fund; and Porsche Ventures, with support from current investors.

References

External links

Official Website

Companies based in Vienna, Virginia
Emergency road services